This is a list of award winners of the Toronto Maple Leafs and predecessor clubs of the Toronto NHL franchise.

League awards

Team trophies

Individual awards
Ten different Leafs have won the Calder Memorial Trophy, more than any other team.

All-Stars

NHL first and second team All-Stars
The NHL first and second team All-Stars are the top players at each position as voted on by the Professional Hockey Writers' Association.

NHL All-Rookie Team
The NHL All-Rookie Team consists of the top rookies at each position as voted on by the Professional Hockey Writers' Association.

All-Star Game selections
The National Hockey League All-Star Game is a mid-season exhibition game held annually between many of the top players of each season. Sixty-four All-Star Games have been held since 1947, with at least one player chosen to represent the Maple Leafs in each year. The All-Star game has not been held in various years: 1979 and 1987 due to the 1979 Challenge Cup and Rendez-vous '87 series between the NHL and the Soviet national team, respectively, 1995, 2005, and 2013 as a result of labor stoppages, 2006, 2010, and 2014 because of the Winter Olympic Games, and 2021 as a result of the COVID-19 pandemic. Toronto has hosted eight of the games.

 Selected by fan vote
 Selected as one of four "last men in" by fan vote
 All-Star Game Most Valuable Player

All-Star benefit games
Prior to the institution of the National Hockey League All-Star Game the league held three different benefit games featuring teams of all-stars.  The first was the Ace Bailey Benefit Game, held in 1934, after a violent collision with Eddie Shore of the Boston Bruins left Toronto's Ace Bailey hospitalized and unable to continue his playing career.  In 1937 the Howie Morenz Memorial Game was held to raise money for the family of Howie Morenz of the Montreal Canadiens who died from complications after being admitted to the hospital for a broken leg.  The Babe Siebert Memorial Game was held in 1939 to raise funds for the family of the Canadiens' Babe Siebert who drowned shortly after he retired from playing.

All-Star Game replacement events

Career achievements

Hockey Hall of Fame
The following persons have been inducted into the Hockey Hall of Fame. The list includes anyone who played for the Toronto NHL franchise (which includes the Arenas and St. Pats) who was later inducted as a player. The list of builders includes anyone inducted as a builder who spent any part of their career in a coaching, management, or ownership role with Toronto. As of 2017, 62 players have been inducted, more than any other franchise.

 Played for the Toronto Arenas or Toronto St. Pats.

Foster Hewitt Memorial Award
Four members of the Maple Leafs organization have been honored with the Foster Hewitt Memorial Award. The award is presented by the Hockey Hall of Fame to members of the radio and television industry who make outstanding contributions to their profession and the game of ice hockey during their broadcasting career.

Retired numbers

The Leafs had a policy of retiring numbers only for players "who have made a significant contribution to the Toronto Maple Leaf Hockey Club and have experienced a career-ending incident while a member of the Maple Leaf team", although this policy was changed for the Leafs centennial season, when they announced the retirement of 11 additional numbers belonging to 17 different players. Barilko (who died in a plane crash during his playing career) and Bailey (whose career ended with a severe head injury) met the criteria prior to the team's centennial season. Ron Ellis received permission from Bailey, by the time of his career the Leafs' Director of Scouting, to wear number 6. Also out of circulation is the number 99 which was retired league-wide for Wayne Gretzky on February 6, 2000. Gretzky did not play for the Maple Leafs during his 20-year NHL career and the only Maple Leaf to wear the number prior to its retirement was Wilf Paiement during his three seasons with the team in the early 1980s.

Team awards

Molson Cup
The Molson Cup is an award given to the player who earns the most points from three-star selections during the regular season.

Other awards

See also
List of National Hockey League awards

References

Toronto
award
Awards